The 2019–20 Portland Pilots women's basketball team represents the University of Portland in the 2019–20 NCAA Division I women's basketball season. The Pilots are led by first year coach Michael Meek. They play their homes games at Chiles Center and are members of the West Coast Conference.

Roster

Schedule and results

|-
!colspan=9 style=| Exhibition

|-
!colspan=9 style=| Non-conference regular season

|-
!colspan=9 style=| WCC regular season

|-
!colspan=9 style=| WCC Women's Tournament

|-
!colspan=9 style=| NCAA Women's Tournament

See also
 2019–20 Portland Pilots men's basketball team

References

Portland
Portland Pilots women's basketball seasons